List of talukas in Chandrapur district, Maharashtra India. 15 talukas of Chandrapur district.

List of talukas in Chandrapur district 

 Chandrapur
 Bhadravati
 Warora
 Chimur
 Nagbhid
 Bramhapuri
 Sindewahi
 Mul
 Saoli
 Gondpimpri
 Rajura
 Korpana
 Pomburna
 Ballarpur
 Jivati

References

See also 
Chandrapur district

List of talukas of Maharashtra

Chandrapur district